Little Nightmares is a puzzle-platform horror adventure game developed by Tarsier Studios and published by Bandai Namco Entertainment for PlayStation 4, Windows and Xbox One. A Nintendo Switch version was released in May 2018, followed by a Google Stadia version in June 2020 and then a mobile version will be released at winter 2023 and published by Playdigious. Set in a mysterious world, Little Nightmares follows the journey of Six, a hungry little girl who must escape the Maw, an iron vessel inhabited by monstrous, twisted beings. The game received positive reviews upon release with critics praising its atmosphere, graphics, and sound while criticizing its checkpoint system and a short length. A prequel, Little Nightmares II, was released in February 2021.

Gameplay
Little Nightmares takes place in a 2.5D world. The player traverses the world through various platformer elements, occasionally being blocked by puzzles that must be solved to proceed. The player is generally rendered helpless in their environment due to the lack of any combat abilities and must rely on stealth and the environment to hide from the various enemies. On a few occasions, the player is given tools that even the odds slightly and allow them to fight back.

Plot
Six, a nine-year-old girl in a yellow raincoat, awakens from a dream of a woman wearing a kimono and a Noh mask. Armed with only a lighter, she sneaks through the bowels of the Maw, a massive, underwater iron vessel. Throughout the Maw, she encounters Nomes: small, skittish creatures that either flee from her or passively observe her efforts. She has the option to hug the Nomes, should she get close to one. In the Prison, where captured children are held, Six evades the carnivorous Leeches that infest its depths and artificial eyes that will turn her to stone if she is caught in their lights. Six also regularly experiences debilitating bouts of hunger; whenever she eats, a shadowy, flickering version of herself appears. After eating some bread offered by an imprisoned child, Six is captured by the blind, long-armed Janitor who supervises the captured children. She escapes but makes no effort to help the other children. She falls into a room filled with piles of shoes and evades the unseen monster moving underneath. The Janitor eventually corners Six, but she severs his arms with a collapsing door.

Caught by another bout of hunger, Six is forced to eat a live rat. She travels to the Kitchen, where children wrapped up in butcher paper are being sent. Here, the grotesque Twin Chefs are preparing a feast and pursue Six whenever they spot her. She makes her way outside to the hull of the Maw, above the ocean waves. Scaling the hull, Six witnesses a procession of obese, suited Guests marching into the Maw from their vessel. They lumber into a Japanese-style Guest Area, where they gorge themselves on food. The feast is overseen by the mysterious Lady from Six's dream, the masked proprietress of the Maw. Several Guests scramble after Six, but she outruns them. When she has another hunger attack, a Nome offers her a sausage. However, Six eats the Nome instead.

Six follows the Lady up into her Quarters, which are strewn with broken mirrors. Pursued by the Lady, Six finds an unbroken mirror, which she uses to repel her. The sight of her own reflection causes the Lady pain and eventually subdues her. As the Lady lies defenseless and weakened, Six experiences a final hunger attack. She bites the Lady's neck, killing her and absorbing her magical powers. Six walks back through the Guest Area, surrounded by a dark aura. Some of the Guests try to eat her, but their lives are instantly drained and their necks snapped by her new powers. She passes through a door and proceeds up a staircase and out into the sunlight, while all the Nomes she has hugged gather at the open doorway.

In a post-credits scene, Six waits by the entrance of the Maw while a foghorn is heard in the distance.

DLC plot

Secrets of the Maw
A trio of DLC levels that offer a "different perspective on Six's adventures" was planned. The first, released in July 2017, a second in November 2017, and a third in February 2018.

The Depths
A boy called the Runaway Kid wakes up from a nightmare involving him swimming in darkness before being dragged underwater. After leaving the Nursery, he follows a girl who is also fleeing, but later disappears. She leaves behind a flashlight, which the Runaway Kid takes.

The Runaway Kid falls into the Depths of the Maw, which are heavily flooded. He avoids Leeches and makes his way across by hopping on floating platforms. The Depths are home to the Granny, who swims underwater and attempts to grab the Runaway Kid either by bumping/destroying the floating platforms he stands on or by snatching him if he is in the water for too long. After pushing a plugged TV set into the water to electrocute and kill the Granny, the Runaway Kid leaves the Depths but is then captured by the Janitor. The final scene shows the Runaway Kid in a cage next to other trapped children, including Six. The Janitor pulls the Runaway Kid's cage away, paralleling Six's main-game story just before she wakes up in her cage.

The Hideaway
Wrapped in butcher paper and ascending on a hook towards the Kitchen, the Runaway Kid breaks free and falls into a new level of the Maw, finding an engine room where Nomes throw coal into a furnace. After evading the Janitor, the Kid uses the Nomes to power up the furnace. The bucket elevator in the engine room becomes fully functional and lifts the Runaway Kid up to a furnace room where more Nomes are gathered, their shadows cast by the furnace's light resembling children. After leaving, the Runaway Kid finds himself on top of a rising elevator occupied by the Lady.

The Residence
The Runaway Kid enters the Lady's Residence. After solving a series of puzzles to find three missing statues while fighting off the Shadow Children, he finds the Lady looking at herself in a mirror, her unmasked face in the reflection revealed to be gruesome and deformed. The Lady is alerted to the Runaway Kid's presence and transforms him into a Nome. He then finds his way into the Guest Area and the room with the sausage in Six's story. The chapter ends with the Runaway Kid standing by the sausage, indicating that he is indeed the Nome whom Six eats. When the credits for Secrets of the Maw roll, they are eventually shown to be on a television set, which shows a figure reminiscent of the Thin Man.

Development
With the game, the team wanted to explore the "wild extremes" of childhood. The game's setting, the Maw, was created as a piece of concept art "where all the worst things in the world could be left to rot". In keeping with the theme of childhood, the team opted against creating a powerful protagonist. While the gameplay has been described as stealth-based, the team prefers to describe it as "hide and seek" feeling that even the term "stealth" gives the impression of an empowered character.

The game was originally announced by Tarsier Studios in May 2014 under the title Hunger, with no known publisher for release on PlayStation 4. After a teaser trailer in February 2015, nothing was heard of the project until August 2016, when Bandai Namco Entertainment announced that they had entered into a worldwide publishing agreement with Tarsier for the project, which was now re-titled Little Nightmares. The team opted to change the name to differentiate it from The Hunger Games series thus making it easier to search for.

Reception

Little Nightmares received "generally positive" reviews, according to video game review aggregator Metacritic.

Cory Arnold said on Destructoid "Little Nightmares hypnotized me with ever-present suspense," and awarded it a score of 8.5/10.

Jonathan Leack from Game Revolution gave the game a score of 3 out of 5 stars saying that "Little Nightmares appears to have a double meaning. On one hand, the gameplay is a nightmare, regularly testing your patience and will to push forward. On the other, the atmosphere and audio design prove terrifying in a way that horror friends will admire. There's an equal amount of qualities to like and dislike, but when it comes down to it Little Nightmares succeeds at delivering on its promise of being an interesting horror game unlike anything else."

Sam Prell of GamesRadar+ awarded it 4 out of 5 stars stating that "At times mechanically clumsy, but artistically sound, Little Nightmares might get on your nerves every once in a while, but its imagery will burrow into your brain and never leave."

Joe Skrebels's score of 8.8/10 on IGN said that "gleefully strange, unceasingly grim, and quietly smart, Little Nightmares is a very welcome fresh take on horror."

"An okay platformer but a deeply imaginative horror game, Little Nightmares is worth playing for its array of disturbing imagery," was Samuel's Roberts's conclusion on PC Gamer with a score of 78/100.

Whitney Reynolds gave Little Nightmares an 8.5/10 score on Polygon with the consensus: "Little Nightmares worked its way into my dreams because it's just bright enough, just safe enough to make me let my guard down. The game isn’t always successful at balancing some game design fundamentals. But when the lights went out, it left me remembering that, really, I'm just a small thing in a dangerous world myself. Also, that monsters with big long grabby arms are really, really creepy."

Alice Bell's 9/10 score on VideoGamer.com stated that "Little Nightmares is frightening, in a way that gets under your skin. A way that whispers in your ear that you won't sleep well tonight. Little Nightmares takes things you were afraid of when you were a kid, and reminds you you're still afraid now."

Eurogamer ranked the game 28th on their list of the "Top 50 Games of 2017", and GamesRadar+ ranked it 20th on their list of the 25 Best Games of 2017, while Polygon ranked it 27th on their list of the 50 best games of 2017. It was nominated for "Best Platformer" and "Best Art Direction" in IGN's Best of 2017 Awards.

Sales
The game debuted at #4 on the UK all-format sales chart in its first week. The Complete Edition sold 12,817 copies within its first week in Japan, placing it at #15 on the all-format sales chart. As of August 2018, the game has sold over one million copies across all platforms. In May 2020, Bandai Namco announced that more than 2 million units have been sold.

Accolades

Legacy

Follow-up
In regards to a prequel, Tarsier Studios stated that they had many ideas on things they still like to explore. At Gamescom 2019, Little Nightmares II was announced for a 2020 release. It features a new player character known as Mono, with Six returning as a computer-controlled character, and its story precedes the events of Little Nightmares. The prequel was released on February 11, 2021.

Even though Tarsier Studios has previously claimed that Little Nightmares II will be the last game in the series, Bandai Namco Entertainment have expressed interest for continuing the series in some form, as they consider Little Nightmare to be a "Headline IP".

Phone application
A mobile app titled Very Little Nightmares was announced in April 2019 and was released in May 2019 on iOS. The story acts as a prequel to Little Nightmares and Little Nightmares II.

Television series
In 2017, Dmitri M. Johnson and Stephan Bugaj of DJ2 Entertainment announced that they will be producing a television adaptation of Little Nightmares. The series will also involve Anthony and Joe Russo and the pilot will be directed by Henry Selick.

Comic books
Little Nightmares had a four issue tie-in comic, written by John Shackleford and penciled by Aaron Alexovitch, and published by Titan Comics. Two issues were released both in hard and digital copies, with the last two being cancelled. A hardcover graphic novel of the first two issues was released at the end of October 2017.

Notes

References

External links
 

2017 video games
Bandai Namco games
Engine Software games
2010s horror video games
Nintendo Switch games
PlayStation 4 games
PlayStation 4 Pro enhanced games
Puzzle-platform games
Single-player video games
Stadia games
Indie video games
Survival video games
Unreal Engine games
Video games about cannibalism
Video games about children
Video games about witchcraft
Video games adapted into comics
Video games developed in Sweden
Video games featuring female protagonists
Video games that use Amiibo figurines
Video games with downloadable content
Windows games
Xbox One games
Playdigious games